The  is the collective name for an archaeological site consisting of six separate clusters of Kofun period  burial mounds located in what is now part of the town of Kawanishi, Yamagata in the Tōhoku region of Japan. The site was designated a National Historic Site of Japan in 2000.

Overview
The Shimokomatsu Kofun group consists of 202 known kofun arranged into six clusters on a long ridge at an altitude of 230 to 280 meters in the Shimokomatsu neighborhood of Kawanishi. This cluster contains over half of the keyhole-shaped tumuli which have been found in Yamagata. These kofun were built from the end of the  4th century to the early 6th century AD. Archaeological excavations are ongoing, and various grave goods such as bronze mirrors, jewelry, weapons and agricultural tools have been recovered. The National Historic Site designation encompasses a total of 179 tumuli in three groups.

The site is located approximately 10 minutes by car from Uzen-Komatsu Station on the JR East Yonesaka Line.

See also
List of Historic Sites of Japan (Yamagata)

References

External links
Enjoy Yamagata home page
Kawanishi home page official site 

Kofun
History of Yamagata Prefecture
Kawanishi, Yamagata
Archaeological sites in Japan
Historic Sites of Japan